Kim Tae-nyeon (Korean: 김태년, born 20 March 1965) is a South Korean politician and former activist who previously served as the parliamentary leader of the liberal Democratic Party of Korea (DPK). He was the acting President of the party from 9 March to 8 April 2021. He is also the Member of the National Assembly for Seongnam Sujeong (2004-2008; 2012-).

Early life 
Kim Tae-nyeon was born in Suncheon, South Jeolla in 1965. His father was a cobbler while his mother was a fish seller at a market. He attended Suncheon High School and obtained a bachelor's and a master's degree in public administration at Kyung Hee University. His early dream was to be a journalist.

Career 
Kim used to be the President of the Student Council at Kyung Hee University Suwon Campus, as well as a member of the Association of National University Student Representatives. He led a student movement during the June Struggle. Other than these, he also led various local movement in Seongnam.

Political career 
He was brought to the Millennium Democratic Party (MDP) by the then President Kim Dae-jung in 2000. In 2003, he left the MDP and formed the National Political Party for Reform (NPPR) that was later merged into the Uri Party, along with Rhyu Si-min. He, however, helped the MDP presidential candidate Roh Moo-hyun during the presidential election in December.

Kim was firstly elected to the National Assembly in 2004 election, defeating the GNP candidate Kim Eul-dong with a majority of 13.7%. Being just 39-year-old, he was the youngest MP-elected at the election. He was appointed one of the deputy parliamentary leaders of the Uri Party in February 2007. He lost to Shin Yeong-su in 2008 election by 129 votes majority.

Kim successfully made a comeback in 2012 election, receiving 54.76% and defeated Shin. In 2017 presidential election, he helped the Democratic presidential candidate Moon Jae-in.

In May 2019, Kim contested the party's election for parliamentary leadership but lost to Lee In-young. On 7 May 2020, he contested again and was elected the parliamentary leader of the Democratic Party.

On 9 March 2021, Kim became the acting President of the Democratic Party following the resignation of Lee Nak-yon, which was considered to run for the upcoming presidential election. However, he resigned on 8 April following the party's huge suffer in the 2021 by-elections.

Controversies 
On 22 January 2018, Kim provoked a controversy when he sent a note to the Minister of Employment and Labour Kim Young-joo. The note was saying, "Don't make an issue of Suncheon Job World. Kim Tae-nyeon's business." The same day, he also made a mistake when he said that the 2018 Winter Olympics would be held in Pyongyang.

On 5 October, during the celebration of 11th anniversary of the 2007 North–South Summit Declaration held in Pyongyang, he was told by Ri Son-gwon, "Don't task financial issues to a big belly".

Election results

General elections

References

External links 
 Official website
 Kim Tae-nyeon on Facebook
 Kim Tae-nyeon on Twitter
 Kim Tae-nyeon on Blog

1965 births
Living people
Members of the National Assembly (South Korea)